Joshua Baldwin Clarke (March 8, 1879 – July 2, 1962) was a Major League Baseball outfielder who played for five seasons. He played for the Louisville Colonels in 1898, the St. Louis Cardinals in 1905, the Cleveland Naps from 1908 to 1909, and the Boston Rustlers in 1911. He is the brother of National Baseball Hall of Famer Fred Clarke.

References

External links

1879 births
1962 deaths
Louisville Colonels players
Cleveland Naps players
St. Louis Cardinals players
Boston Rustlers players
Minor league baseball managers
St. Paul Apostles players
St. Paul Saints (Western League) players
Hartford Indians players
Wooden Nutmegs players
Des Moines Hawkeyes players
Des Moines Midgets players
Des Moines Undertakers players
Des Moines Prohibitionists players
Toledo Mud Hens players
Columbus Senators players
St. Paul Saints (AA) players
Kansas City Blues (baseball) players
Sioux City Packers players
Sioux City Indians players
Drake Bulldogs baseball coaches
19th-century baseball players
People from Winfield, Kansas